Lerona may refer to:

 Lerona, California, United States
 Lerona, West Virginia, United States